The 1995 New Mexico Lobos football team was an American football team that represented the University of New Mexico in the Western Athletic Conference (WAC) during the 1995 NCAA Division I-A football season.  In their fourth season under head coach Dennis Franchione, the Lobos compiled a 4–7 record (2–6 against WAC opponents) and were outscored by a total of 303 to 256. 

The team's statistical leaders included Donald Sellers with 1,693 passing yards, Winslow Oliver with 915 rushing yards, Steve Pagador with 492 receiving yards, and kicker Colby Cason with 58 points scored.

Schedule

References

New Mexico
New Mexico Lobos football seasons
New Mexico Lobos football